Aéreo Servicio Guerrero S.A. de C.V.  is a Mexican regional airline founded in 1997, based in the Hermosillo International Airport. It has Cessna 402 B, Cessna 402 C and Cessna Caravan 208 B equipment. It has regular flights to the Baja California Peninsula and Sonora, in addition to air taxi service.

Fleet
The airline operates five aircraft, including two Cessna 402 and three Cessna 208 Caravan aircraft.

4 x Cessna 208B
1 x Cessna 402B
1 x Cessna 402C

Destinations
Aéreo Servicio Guerrero operates flights to fourteen destinations in northwestern Mexico.

Incidents 
On 14 October 2013, one of Aéreo Servicio Guerrero's Cessna 208B Grand Caravan aircraft (registration XA-TXM) impacted terrain approximately sixteen miles west of Loreto International Airport after departing on a scheduled commercial passenger service to Ciudad Constitución Airport. According to news sources, Tropical Storm Octave was nearby at the time, and may have been to blame. All fourteen people on board were killed in the incident, which is only in the preliminary stages of investigation

Safety 
In March 2021, private pilot and aviation content creator Noel Philips took a flight on one of Aéreo Servicio Guerrero's Cessna Grand Caravans and expressed concern over the safety of the airline. The single pilot, who was hand-flying the aircraft, was captured on camera with both hands off the yoke using and looking at his smartphone and listening to spotify during the flight, which did not appear to have a functioning autopilot and also appeared to have some inoperative flight instruments.

As a result of the pilot's distraction, the aircraft's navigation hardware and Philips' personal flight tracking tools both recorded significant deviation from the flight plan.

References

External links

 Official Page 

Airlines of Baja California
Transportation in Baja California Sur
Transportation in Sonora
Airlines of Mexico
Airlines established in 1997